Alberto Barbieri (born 1903, date of death unknown) was an Argentine wrestler. He competed in the men's Greco-Roman lightweight at the 1928 Summer Olympics.

References

External links
 

1903 births
Year of death missing
Argentine male sport wrestlers
Olympic wrestlers of Argentina
Wrestlers at the 1928 Summer Olympics
Place of birth missing